Vegard Amundsen Bergan (born 20 February 1995) is a Norwegian footballer who plays for Start.

Career statistics

Club

References

1995 births
Living people
Norwegian footballers
Odds BK players
FK Bodø/Glimt players
IK Start players
Eliteserien players
Sportspeople from Porsgrunn
Association football defenders